Coombe is a village in Hampshire, England.

Location
Coombe is located at

External links

Coombe